Bokod can refer to:

 Bokod, Benguet: a municipality in Benguet province, Philippines
 Bokod, Hungary: a village in Komárom-Esztergom county, Hungary